Gretna is the second-largest city in, and parish seat of, Jefferson Parish in the U.S. state of Louisiana. Gretna lies on the west bank of the Mississippi River, just east and across the river from uptown New Orleans. It is part of the New Orleans–Metairie–Kenner metropolitan statistical area. The population was 17,814 at the 2020 U.S. census.

History
According to the history published by the city, Gretna's history can be traced to a plantation established by Jean-Charles de Pradel by 1750 (when the plantation house, Monplaisir, was built). By 1813, the plantation had passed into the hands of one François Bernoudy. John McDonogh (also spelled John McDonough), then a resident of New Orleans, bought the establishment, moved into the house and founded a settlement in 1815, that would be named McDonoghville. He subdivided the rest of the former plantation into regular city lots and 30-arpent farming strips. McDonoghville thus became the first subdivision in Jefferson Parish. McDonough either leased or sold these properties to white laborers or free people of color.

Gretna was settled in 1836, originally as Mechanikham, growing with a station on the Mississippi River for the Missouri Pacific Railroad, Texas and Pacific Railway, and Southern Pacific Railroad, with a ferry across the River to New Orleans.  The famous food and spice company Zatarain's, founded in 1889 in New Orleans, has been located in Gretna since 1963. Gretna was incorporated in 1913, absorbing the section of McDonogh within the Jefferson Parish boundaries. In the 1940 census, Gretna had a population of 10,879.

Hurricane Katrina controversy

The city and its police received considerable press coverage when, in the aftermath of Hurricane Katrina on August 29, 2005, people who attempted to escape from New Orleans by walking over the Crescent City Connection bridge over the Mississippi River were turned back at gunpoint by City of Gretna Police, along with Crescent City Connection Police, and Jefferson Parish Sheriff's deputies, who set up a roadblock on the bridge in the days following the hurricane. According to eyewitnesses, some officers threatened to shoot those coming from New Orleans as they attempted to cross into Gretna on foot, shots were fired overhead, and downdraft from a police helicopter was used to help clear refugees from the bridge. New Orleans Police Department 911 operator Patryce Jenkins, having walked the city for two days after her dispatch center was flooded, tried to return to her unflooded Gretna apartment via the bridge. Though she had ID to prove her status as a resident, she said instead of checking it police ordered her to turn back, used racial slurs, and fired a warning shot over her head, leaving her crying in disbelief.

Gretna mayor Ronnie Harris pointed out though the city had not flooded, Gretna had been severely damaged as well, losing power, water, and sewage services, claiming the city had no food, no water, no shelters, and no capacity to take refugees. Harris said that the city had commandeered buses and been transporting a crowd of about 6,000 refugees to a nearby FEMA facility. But he said the city enacted the blockade after a spate of door-to-door robberies began in Gretna and stores at the Oakwood Mall were looted and burned. Residents of Gretna were themselves required to evacuate after a few days. Four federal civil lawsuits were filed against the city for violation of civil rights. Two were dismissed, and in a third the Jefferson Parish Sheriff's Office settled with a family from Algiers for $10,000. A fourth federal case, involving Regional Transit Authority workers, was scheduled to go to trial in April 2011. Several other cases were filed in New Orleans Civil District Court.

Geography

Gretna is located at  (29.916459, -90.054260) and has an elevation of  behind the levee along the Mississippi River.

Demographics

According to the 2020 United States census, there were 17,814 people residing in the city. The 2019 American Community Survey determined there were 7,156 households and 3,954 families residing in the city limits. In 2010, there were 17,734 people, 6,958 households, and 4,286 families residing in the city.

In 2020, the racial and ethnic makeup was 41.24% non-Hispanic white, 32.96% Black or African American, 0.47% Native American, 2.75% Asian, 0.03% Pacific Islander, 3.81% multiracial or some other race, and 18.73% Hispanic and Latino American of any race. In 2019, the racial and ethnic makeup of the city was 44.9% non-Hispanic White, 35.5% Black and African American, 0.3% American Indian and Alaska Native, 1.9% Asian, 0.1% Native Hawaiian and other Pacific Islander, 0.2% some other race, 1.3% two or more races, and 16% Hispanic and Latino American of any race. In 2010, the racial makeup of the city was 48.05% White, 20.43% African American, 1.20% Native American, 8.12% Asian, 0.15% Pacific Islander, 4.03% from other races, and 2.45% from two or more races. Hispanic or Latino Americans of any race were 24.38% of the population. From 2010 to 2020, the growth of Hispanic or Latino Americans reflected nationwide demographic trends of diversification and identity.

In 2010, there were 6,958 households, out of which 27.7% had children under the age of 18 living with them, 35.7% were married couples living together, 19.6% had a female householder with no husband present, and 38.4% were non-families. 32.7% of all households were made up of individuals, and 11.3% had someone living alone who was 65 years of age or older. The average household size was 2.40 and the average family size was 3.06.

In the city, the age distribution of the population shows 23.8% under the age of 18, 10.2% from 18 to 24, 30.6% from 25 to 44, 21.4% from 45 to 64, and 14.0% who were 65 years of age or older. The median age was 36 years, higher than Louisiana's median age of 34.0 years. For every 100 females, there were 100.1 males. For every 100 females age 18 and over, there were 98.3 males.

As of 2019, the median household income in Gretna was $47,244. Males had a median income of $44,902 versus $31,992 for females. Approximately 17.8% of the population lived at or below the poverty line. In 2010, the median income for a household in the city was $28,065, and the median income for a family was $31,881. Males had a median income of $28,259 versus $21,019 for females. The per capita income for the city was $15,735. About 20.8% of families and 24.2% of the population were below the poverty line, including 34.7% of those under age 18 and 20.2% of those age 65 or over.

Government and infrastructure

The United States Postal Service operates the Gretna Post Office.

Police
The city has a police department that was established in 1913.

In 2016, press reports indicated that local police made 6,566 adult arrests in 2013, a rate about fourteen times that of a typical city. Such arrests may have generated over $5 million in fines and other revenue for the city. In July 2019 it was reported that two officers of the Gretna Police were fired for threatening United States Representative Alexandria Ocasio-Cortez.

Education

Primary and secondary schools
Gretna's public schools are operated by the Jefferson Parish Public Schools system.

Schools serving portions of the city limits are in the City of Gretna unless otherwise noted. Zoned elementary schools serving sections of Gretna include Shirley T. Johnson Gretna Park Elementary School, William Hart Elementary School, and McDonogh #26 Elementary School. George Cox Elementary School, which also serves a portion of Gretna, is in Timberlane, an unincorporated area of Jefferson Parish.

Most residents are zoned to Gretna Middle School, while some are zoned to Livaudais Middle School in Terrytown. Most residents are zoned to West Jefferson High School in Harvey, an unincorporated area of Jefferson Parish, while some are zoned to Helen Cox High School, also located in Harvey. For advanced studies, residents are zoned to the Gretna Academy.

Gretna #2 Academy for Advanced Studies, a Pre-K to 5th grade magnet school, and L. W. Ruppel Academy, a Pre-K to 8th grade French immersion magnet school, are located in Gretna. Thomas Jefferson High School is another magnet school in Gretna.

Previously Kate Middleton Elementary in Terrytown served a portion of Gretna. In 2012 Kate Middleton Elementary closed.

Milestone Sabis Academy, a K-8 charter school, is in Gretna.

Public libraries
Jefferson Parish Library operates the Gretna Public Library in Gretna. The library includes a  meeting room that can accommodate 58 people. The library is almost twice the size of the previous  facility.

Culture

German American Cultural Center
The German American Cultural Center (GACC), headquartered at 519 Huey P. Long Avenue, was founded in 1988. It strives to interpret the contribution of German immigrants to Louisiana's history by presenting educational opportunities such as exhibits, lectures and other programs. GACC has sponsored special events such as Maifest and Oktoberfest. The latter is a 3-day event held during the first weekend of October each year at the center.

Cultural References to Gretna, Louisiana
 In his book "On the Road", author Jack Kerouac mentions Gretna.
 Portions of the movie "A Love Song for Bobby Long" were filmed in Gretna.
 Portions of "Monster's Ball" were filmed in Gretna.

Notable people
Bianca Del Rio (born Roy Haylock, 1975), is an American actor, drag queen, insult comedian, costume designer, and reality-show personality in RuPaul's Drag Race
Joseph Bouie, Jr. (born 1946), member of the Louisiana House of Representatives for District 97 in Orleans Parish since 2014; former resident of Gretna
Joseph Cao (b. 1967), attorney and U.S. Representative for Louisiana's 2nd congressional district, 2009-2011
Joe Clay (1938-2016), rockabilly musician
Kiem Do, former captain and Deputy Chief of Staff (Operations) in the Republic of Vietnam Navy
Olaf Fink (1914-1973), educator and state senator for Orleans Parish from 1956 to 1972, is interred at Westlawn Memorial Park and Mausoleum in Gretna.  
Frankie Ford (1939-2015), rock and roll performer
John Fourcade (b. 1960), former New Orleans Saints quarterback was born in Gretna.
Emmett Hardy (1903-1925), early jazz great
Frederick Jacob Reagan Heebe (1922-2014), United States district court judge
Girod Jackson, III, former state representative for Jefferson Parish and former Gretna resident
Eddie Lacy, running back for the Seattle Seahawks
Lash LaRue (1917-1996), Western film actor
John McDonogh (1799-1850), entrepreneur and philanthropist, established McDonoghville section of Gretna.
Greg Monroe, NBA player
Mel Ott (1909–1958), baseball hall of famer
Stanley Joseph Ott (1927-1992), Roman Catholic bishop
Elfrid Payton, Canadian Football League defensive lineman
Elfrid Payton, Jr., professional basketball player
James St. Raymond, businessman and former state representative in Orleans Parish; former resident of Gretna 
Ike Taylor, Retired defensive back who played his entire career for the Pittsburgh Steelers
Scott Williams,  bassist for sludge metal band Soilent Green, died in 2004 in Gretna.

See also
 Gretna Heritage Festival

Notes

References

External links

City of Gretna Website
Gretna Police Department
Gretna Heritage Festival
The real heroes and sheroes of New Orleans (First report of the bridge incident that was later picked up by major media.)
March to Gretna
"The Bridge to Gretna" story from CBS News 60 Minutes program, December 18, 2005
Schools
Gretna Middle School
Elementary schools: Shirley T. Johnson/Gretna Park, William Hart, McDonogh #26
Gretna No. 2 Academy for Advanced Studies

Audio and video
Trapped in New Orleans: Emergency Medical Worker Describes How Police Prevented Evacuation, from Pacifica Democracy Now! program, September 16, 2005

Cities in Louisiana
Cities in Jefferson Parish, Louisiana
Cities in the New Orleans metropolitan area
Parish seats in Louisiana
Populated places established in 1836
Louisiana populated places on the Mississippi River
1836 establishments in Louisiana